BriteCloud is a self-contained expendable Digital Radio Frequency Memory (DRFM) jammer developed by Selex ES (merged into Leonardo since 2017) to help protect military aircraft. The decoy was launched by Selex ES at a conference held at the Churchill War Rooms, London on 6 November 2013.

Background

Military aircraft face a highly developed airborne and surface-based RF threat. Mobile surface-to-air missiles with highly accurate RF tracking systems present a formidable threat when used in pop-up mode, and many older systems have been retrofitted with modern electronics that have greatly enhanced their capabilities. The modern systems are particularly difficult to counter, and have an array of Electronic Protection Measures (EPM) at their disposal.

Description

BriteCloud has been developed to protect platforms against these modern tracking systems. Its technology builds on previous generations of electronic countermeasures such as repeaters and Towed Radar Decoys (TRD). When launched, the battery-powered decoy searches for and counters priority threats. Incoming radar pulses are received and the BriteCloud’s onboard computer copies these pulses and uses them to simulate a ‘false target’ so that the threat system cannot detect the deception. By doing this, BriteCloud can ‘seduce’ the most modern threats away from the host platform, generating large miss distances.

It is available in two versions: the BriteCloud 55 decoy launched from standard 55mm diameter chaff/flare cartridge dispensers, and the BriteCloud 218 decoy launched from smaller 2”×1”×8” square-format standard cartridge dispensers. In 2019, the development of a more powerful version of the BriteCloud 55 was announced, called the 55-T. This provides protection for bigger military aircraft with larger Radar cross-sections, eg. the C-130 Hercules.

Development and Testing

The first trials of the BriteCloud 55 decoy on the Eurofighter Typhoon took place in April 2019. Integration work on the aircraft is ongoing, as part of Project Centurion. Once in service with the RAF, BriteCloud will be one of the countermeasures available to the Typhoon’s Praetorian DASS.

The BriteCloud 218 version was first tested on a Royal Danish Air Force F-16, successfully deploying the decoy after a real Surface-to-Air missile targeting system was used to lock on to the aircraft.

The BriteCloud 218 decoy has now been approved by the US Air National Guard for deployment on its F-16 fleet, after the US Defence Department's Foreign Comparative Testing trials that began in 2019. It uses standard-size rectangular (square-format) rounds, compatible with common dispensers for example the AN/ALE-47, and is thus useable on other 4th Generation fighters including the F-15, F/A-18 and A-10. Its US designation will be the AN/ALQ-260(V)1.

The decoy has been integrated on the General Atomics MQ-9 Reaper and MQ-9B Sky/SeaGuardian UCAVs after testing in late 2020. It's deployed by an AN/ALE-47 dispenser, part of the aircraft's Self-Protection Pod.

Partners

Selex ES announced at the 2013 launch event that defence and security company Saab will be the first partner to offer the new decoy as an optional electronic warfare enhancement for all versions of the Gripen, both new and existing.

See also
 Digital radio frequency memory
 Active protection system
 Electronic countermeasures
 Electronic warfare
 Gripen

References

External links
 BriteCloud DRFM on Leonardocompany.com

Missile countermeasures
Electronic countermeasures
Electronic warfare equipment
Selex ES
Military equipment introduced in the 2010s